The deputy prime minister of Sweden is the deputy head of government of Sweden. The incumbent deputy prime minister is Ebba Busch.

The Swedish constitution allows the prime minister to appoint one of the ministers in the cabinet as deputy prime minister (sometimes unofficially known as vice statsminister), in case the prime minister for some reason is prevented from performing his or her duties. If a deputy prime minister has not been appointed, the minister in the cabinet who has served the longest time (and if there are several with equal experience the one who is oldest) takes over as head of government (these are marked in italic in the table below).

A deputy prime minister can only serve as prime minister in a temporary function, as the resignation of a prime minister automatically includes the entire Cabinet, and the Instrument of Government requires the Speaker of the Riksdag to dismiss the Cabinet in the case of the death of the prime minister.

History

Origins of the office 
Historically, under the 1809 Instrument of Government, the Minister for Foreign Affairs (the "second excellency" and to date the only formal "minister" save for the Prime Minister, the other cabinet members' formal title being Councillor of State for... etc) was to function as acting Prime Minister should the Prime Minister not be able not to perform his duties. With the enactment of the 1974 Instrument of Government and the inauguration of Thorbjörn Fälldin's three-party cabinet in 1976, Per Ahlmark was formally sworn in as the first to hold the office of Deputy Prime Minister.

Palme assassination 
In 1986 Deputy Prime Minister Ingvar Carlsson became acting Prime Minister for the transitional cabinet from March 1 to March 12, upon the assassination of Olof Palme, the only time the death of the Prime Minister has caused the Deputy Prime Minister to temporarily assume the office. Carlsson subsequently received the task of forming a new cabinet from the Speaker of the Riksdag. The cabinet was approved by the Riksdag on March 12, 1986, effectively reappointing most cabinet members in their previous offices.

Role in coalition governments 
The role and position of a Deputy Prime Minister may vary. In the five last coalition cabinets, Fälldin III, Bildt and Reinfeldt I and II, and Löfven, the Deputy Prime Minister was the head of the second-largest coalition partner (Liberals in Fälldin III, Bildt and Reinfeldt II, Centre in Reinfeldt I, Green in Löfven). In the governments Fälldin I and II, however, the Deputy Prime Ministership belonged to the Liberal Party despite the fact that it was the smallest of the three members. The reason for this might be ascribed to an unwillingness on behalf of the Centre and Liberals to give this position to the Moderates, due to ideological differences. In all of these governments, however, the Deputy Prime Minister also had a regular Cabinet portfolio.

In July 2015, the office of the Deputy Prime Minister was the subject of some political debate. Following a brief illness of the social democratic Prime Minister, Stefan Löfven, the Prime Minister's office revealed that the Deputy Prime Minister Åsa Romson of the Green Party, although named Vice statsminister ("Vice Prime Minister") when the cabinet took office in October 2014, was in fact not expected to temporarily assume the duties of the Prime Minister as Statsministerns ställföreträdare ("Deputy of the Prime Minister") as stated in the Instrument of Government, instead yielding to the most senior minister of the cabinet. Effectively this made the social democratic then-Foreign Minister Margot Wallström the actual deputy of the Prime Minister, due to seniority rather than appointment. It also rendered the title of Vice statsminister an honorary title, for the most senior member of the party functioning as junior partner in the governing coalition, rather than an actual function.

Role in one-party governments 
The situation is different in the one-party governments that have existed since the position of Deputy Prime Minister was introduced in 1976, namely the Liberal Ullsten government and the Social Democratic governments Palme II, Carlsson I-III and Persson. While Mona Sahlin might well have been described as something of a "successor-in-waiting" (even if she ultimately did not succeed Ingvar Carlsson to the Premiership), the other Deputy Prime Ministers have tended to be older and experienced politicians who have often been in charge of coordinating the work of the Government and may also have been in charge of some policy areas of their own which were not substantial enough to warrant a full-time Cabinet position, such as Bo Ringholm, who was Minister of Sport concurrently with being Deputy Prime Minister.

Legal status 
According to 10 § Chapter 6 of the Instrument of Government, the Prime Minister may appoint a deputy who assumes the duties of the Prime Minister in case the latter is for some reason prevented from performing their duties. If such a deputy has not been appointed or if the appointed deputy is prevented from performing their duties, the minister who has served for the longest period of time assumes the office. If two or more ministers have served for an equal amount of time, seniority decides.

List of officeholders

List of people with the honorary title of "deputy prime minister" 
When Stefan Löfven became Prime Minister of Sweden he appointed a cabinet minister with the honorary title of "deputy prime minister", despite not being the designated stand-in should he not be able to carry out his duties as Prime Minister. The honorary title was awarded to one of the two spokespersons of the Green Party, the junior coalition partner of his cabinet. With Magdalena Anderssons appointment as Prime Minister and the withdrawal of the Green Party from the government, this system ceased.

References

External links
 www.sweden.gov.se

 
Politics of Sweden
Lists of political office-holders in Sweden
1975 establishments in Sweden